Koigi is a village in Järva Parish, Järva County, in Estonia. It was the administrative centre of Koigi Parish.

Nurmsi Airfield (ICAO: EENI) is partially located on the territory of Koigi.

References

 

Villages in Järva County